Molkki is an Indian Hindi-language television drama series produced by Ekta Kapoor under Balaji Telefilms. It was broadcast on Colors TV and ran from 16 November 2020 to 11 February 2022. It starred Priyal Mahajan, Amar Upadhyay.

Premise
The series is set in the Rewari district of Haryana, and focuses on molkki pratha.

The story revolves around Purvi, a 19-year-old girl who becomes the molkki bride of 42-year-old chief Virendra Pratap Singh, a widower and father of two children. She fights for her and other molkki brides' rights, as well as fulfil her responsibilities as wife, daughter-in-law, mother, and chieftess of Rewari.

Plot 

Molkki is an Indian tradition that involves marrying off poor girls to a wealthy man in exchange for money. The storyline of the series revolves around a poor girl named Purvi who is made a Molkki bride for money.

Purvi marries Virendra Pratap Singh, a widowed father of two children and head of a village in Haryana's Rewari district. The initially tense relationship between Virendra's kids and Purvi eases after a while and Purvi makes repeated efforts to bring them and their father closer. While the family is on a picnic Vaibhav, Virendra's half-brother, rapes Priyashi, Purvi's sister, for revenge for a past incident and Anjali, Purvi's and Virendra's sister-in-law records the event. A series of incidents leads to Virendra losing his trust in Purvi and he initially refuses to believe her allegations against his brother, however, she eventually succeeds in exposing Vaibhav's doings. Virendra asks Priyu to decide the punishment but she decides to marry Vaibhav instead. Virendra enforces her wish and arranges the marriage, despite Anjali's plotting to prevent the event. From then on, Vaibhav wants to take revenge on his brother and hires a hitman to shoot him during a land auction. Purvi manages to save Virendra, but he is later attacked by goons who were likewise hired by his brother. Priyu finds out about Vaibhav's intentions during their honeymoon and informs Purvi, leading to the hired goons being caught. After this, Purvi, in a desire to receive better education, enrolls in a nearby college where she has to conceal her wealthy status to avoid ridicule. Meanwhile, Vaibhav decides to punish Priya for her betrayal but, with the intent to scare her, accidentally kills her by pushing her from a cliff. Purvi suspected that Vaibhav planned to hurt his sister and finds strong indications for this in his house and through witnesses. When they confront him, Vaibhav purposefully provokes Virendra to shoot him for his murderous act, hoping that his brother is imprisoned. He succeeds and Virendra is imprisoned, while Vaibhav, wearing a bulletproof jacket, manages to escape with a disguise and attempts to leave the country with the help of Anjali. However, Purvi uncovers her brother-in-law's scheming and thereby frees her husband from imprisonment. But Priyu is still alive and reveals that it has been her plan all along to have Vaibhav accused of her murder. Priyu shoots Vaibhav. Prakashi then swears to wreak havoc in Purvi's life for ruining Vaibhav's life. She with Anjali repeatedly tries to separate Purvi from Virendra but fails. Purvi is horrified by the visual she gets while flying a drone and is angered when she learns that Anjali is the perpetrator of the crime. After Purvi visits the cave, she feels restless and wakes up in the middle of the night due to a nightmare where she sees a woman in chains. She swears to expose her but fails. It is revealed that the woman in chains is none other than Virendra's first wife Sakshi who was assumed dead five years ago. Virendra soon falls in love with Purvi and so does she. Virendra and his family travel to Goa for his destination wedding with Purvi. On the other hand, Prakashi knits a devious plan to ruin their wedding day. As an ecstatic Purvi and Virendra take their wedding vows, the two are taken aback when Juhi and Manas notice Sakshi at the wedding venue and rush towards her. Purvi is shocked to find Sakshi during her wedding with Virendra and is devastated when the wedding is cancelled. Virendra is caught between two worlds as Sakshi's return changes the dynamics of the whole family, leaving Purvi to pretend to be a helper in the house and Virendra seeing Purvi in such a light. Virendra explains to Sakshi everything that happened during her absence and how he ended up marrying Purvi. Purvi prepares to leave, but Sakshi asks her to stay and thanks her for looking after the family in her absence. Further, Sakshi realises that Purvi is not wrong and rather a victim of fate. Purvi pushes Virendra away from her when he tries to get closer to her. Elsewhere, Sakshi takes a big decision in front of the Panchayats and announces that Purvi will share the same position as hers. While Virendra is away on business, Sakshi makes Purvi perform some strange rituals that end up making her feel dirty, hurt, and humiliated. An infuriated Virendra stops the ritual and prevents Purvi from being subjected to further embarrassment. Disturbed by his outburst, Sakshi confronts him regarding his feelings for Purvi. He says that he has started liking Purvi. So Sakshi cuts her wrist. Purvi asks Virendra to continue his life with Sakshi and leave her alone, but Virendra rejects to do so. So Purvi demands a divorce.

Purvi finds herself in a dilemma when Sakshi persuades her to marry Vipul in a bid to make Virendra overcome his feelings for Purvi. When Sakshi asks for Vipul's opinion, he gives his consent to marry Purvi. As Purvi's Haldi ceremony begins, Virendra wins the competition against Vipul, earning the first chance to apply Haldi on her. However, the ceremony comes to a shocking halt when her father refuses to bless the marriage. Purvi expresses her love for Vipul as he takes a firm stand for her. Later, Virendra prevents Purvi from applying turmeric on Vipul. During the wedding ceremony of Purvi, an intoxicated Virendra attempts to confront her and Vipul. In a shocking turn of events, Virendra meets with a tragic accident and falls unconscious. After Purvi signs the divorce papers, Virendra helps her prepare for the wedding. Later, Virendra learns that the divorce process is delayed, and he rushes back to the wedding venue and carries Purvi away. After Virendra stops Purvi's wedding to Vipul, she decides to run away from her home, but Virendra stops her. Considering the recent developments, Purvi makes a heartfelt confession. Sakshi discloses the hard-hitting truth about her return after five long years and reveals that she conspired with Prakashi and Anjali to throw Purvi out of the house. She gave Prakashi and Anjali her property to throw Purvi out of the house. Virendra abandons Sakshi and tells her she is not the same person he knew five years ago. He abandons Sakshi, Prakashi, and Anjali and takes all the property back. Purvi leaves the house, but unfortunately, she meets with an accident and loses her memory.

After 6 months

Purvi is now living with Daksh and his family. Daksh loves Purvi and wants to marry her. Virendra is now the business partner of Daksh and assumes Purvi dead. He while in Delhi hears Purvi's voice in Daksh's phone, he being sure it was Purvi decides to somehow meet her. He sees Purvi busy in the arrangements of her wedding with Daksh and tries to console her to return with him but Purvi claims to not recognise him and faints. Virendra then learns that 6 months earlier Purvi left the house and got hit by Daksh's car where she lost her memory and is now known by her new name Dhwani. Doctor warns everyone to not force her to remember her past or she would die of brain stroke. Virendra is devastated and decides to anyhow get Purvi's memory back. He manages to pursue Daksh and Dhwani to return to Rewari and conduct the marriage ceremony there, to which the duo agrees. Virendra tries all means but Anjali and Prakashi lies about Virendra and forces Daksh to return to Delhi. Priyu wanting Purvi dead plays the marriage video of Purvi and Virendra in the marriage hall. But her plan fails and Purvi regains her memory. She decides neither to stay with Virendra nor with Daksh. The same night Daksh tries to rape her wanting to win over by force but Virendra reaches on time points a gun on him and shoots on him which touches his hand but simultaneously one more bullet touches his heart and Daksh died. Virendra is then arrested for murder. Later in court Arjun the lawyer proves Virendra innocent on the cost of marrying Purvi, to which Purvi agrees (it is later revealed that it was all part of Sakshi's plan). He kidnaps Juhi and Manas and demands 10cr but while saving them a building falls over Manas to which he gets a spine damage and needs a bone marrow transfer. Sakshi decides to have another child but now is not efficient to take the baby. Purvi decides a semen transfer and is now pregnant.

Cast

Main 
 Priyal Mahajan as Purvi Virendra Pratap Singh / Dhvani Virendra Pratap Singh (2020–2022):
 Amar Upadhyay as Virendra Pratap Singh (2020–2022)

Recurring

Toral Rasputra as Sakshi Singh (2021)
 Mohit Hiranandani as Veer Virender Pratap Singh (2021)
 Rishika Nag as Nandini Pratap Singh (2021)
 Anushka Sharma as Juhi Pratap Singh aka khargosh (2020–2022)
 Rithvik Gupta as Manas Pratap Singh aka Genda (2020–2022)
 Supriya Shukla as Prakashi Devi Singh (2020–2022)
 Abhay Bhargava as Bheem aka Mamasarkat (2020–2022)
 Shraddha Jaiswal as Anjali Pratap Singh (2020–2022)
Trilokchander Singh as Sarpanch (2020-2021
 Madhuri Pandey as Chandni Singh Shekhawat (2021)
 Meenakshi Sethi as Nani (2021)
 Tushar Kawale as Yogindra Pratap Singh (2020–2022)
 Akshay Jawrani as Karan (2021)
 Ved Bharadwaj as Mahesh (2020–2022)
 Meena Mir as Savita (2020–2022)
 Dhwani Gori as Priyashi Aarav Choudhary (2020–2022)
 Kajaal Chauhan as Sudha Veer Singh Pratap (2020–2021)
 Vyon Mehta as Duddu (2020–2022)
 Neha Jurel as Jyoti (2020–2022)
 Sanjay Swaraj as Kanji Bhai (2020)
 Lankesh Bhardwaj as Inspector (2020-2021)
 Nikhil Narang as Vipul (2020–2021)
 Manorama Bhattishyam as Bhuri (2020–2022)
 Manish Khanna as Chaudhary Charan Singh (2021–2022)
 Abhishek Singh Pathania as Aarav Charan Singh (2021)
 Shivam Khajuria as Naveen (2020)
 Pranav Kumar as Vaibhav Singh (2020–2021)
 Unknown as Vikas (2021)
 Priyanka Zemse as Aarti (2021)
Trupti Mishra as Radhika (2021)
 Ankit Gera as Daksh Singh Shekhawat (2021)
 Aakash Talwar as Arjun Bajwa (2021)
 Shantanu Monga as Satyam / Thakur Gajraj Singh (2021) / (2022)
 Meenakshi Chugh as Heera Bai (2021–2022)

Production

Development 
The filming of the series began in October 2020.

The series addresses the bride buying custom in Haryana.

Reception
ThePrint stated the series tackled the issue of brides for sale when Purvi is forced into marriage with the sarpanch who is twice her age for money. ThePrint also said that the series was "as real as it gets" and that "the serial is set in Haryana and Uttar Pradesh where such marriage transactions are only too often the tragedy".

Influence
On 15 June 2021, the villagers of a small village in Rajasthan were inspired after seeing the series, and they banned molkki pratha in their village. Actor Amar Upadhyay later confirmed the same and was proud to change the thinking of people with their show.

Sequel
A reboot of the show named Molkki - Rishton Ki Agnipariksha, aired on the same channel start from 13 February 2023. It stars Ashish Kapoor and Vidhi Yadav. and Molkki - Rishton Ki Agnipariksha is the mark the TV debut of Vidhi Yadav.

References

External links 
 Molkki on IMDb
 Molkki on Voot
 

2020 Indian television series debuts
 Balaji Telefilms television series
Colors TV original programming
Hindi-language television shows
Indian drama television series
Indian television soap operas